Sophie Schubert (born 26 February 1997) is a German volleyball player.

Schubert joined Köpenicker SC in January 2015, having previously played for VC Olympia Berlin.

References

Living people
1997 births
German women's volleyball players
Place of birth missing (living people)